The Battle of Praia Bay was fought by the coast of Terceira Island on August 11, 1829, between Portuguese liberals and a Miguelite fleet as part of the Portuguese civil war.

The Miguelites under command of José António Azevedo e Lemos attempted to disembark troops on Terceira island, but were defeated by the liberal troops under command of the Duke of Terceira who controlled a dozen small forts and artillery batteries along five kilometers of the coast. The defeat of the miguelites in this battle was decisive for the affirmation and posterior victory of the liberal ideas in Portugal.

After the war, the municipality of Praia was renamed as Praia da Vitória.

References

Conflicts in 1829
1829 in Portugal
Battles of the Liberal Wars
Battles in the Azores
Naval battles of the Liberal Wars
August 1829 events